Dulha Mil Gaya is a 2010 Indian Hindi-language romantic comedy film directed by Mudassar Aziz. It stars Sushmita Sen, Fardeen Khan and Ishita Sharma in the lead roles whilst Shah Rukh Khan makes a special appearance. It was released on 8 January 2010 and was one of the first Bollywood releases of 2010 (the other being Pyaar Impossible!, which released on the same day). Dulha Mil Gaya was panned by critics and did poorly at the domestic box office, earning back roughly half its budget, but was a hit overseas; it was the final film of Fardeen Khan's career before coming back to acting in Visfot.

Plot 
The story focuses on Donsai (Fardeen Khan), the heir to Dhanraj Empire. Donsai is extremely against marriage and believes one should never ruin his life by getting married. After the passing of his father, Suraj Rattan Dhanraj, the only way to inherit his father's five-billion-rupee company, is to marry his friend's Punjabi daughter, Samarpreet (Ishita Sharma). Donsai gets married in Punjab, and tells Samarpreet that he will return to Punjab after three months of business, though Donsai plans not to come back.

After three months, Samarpreet comes to Donsai's home in Trinidad and Tobago to look for him, where she finds him with another woman. She runs out crying, until she is hit by a car. The car owner, Shimmer (Sushmita Sen), picks her up and takes Samarpreet to her home. When they get to Shimmer's home, it turns out Shimmer is one of Donsai's best friends. After Samarpreet gains consciousness, she tells Shimmer everything Donsai did to her. Shimmer decides to help Samarpreet and gives her a complete makeover—she even changes her name to "Samara".

After Donsai sees Samara (not knowing that she is his wife), he falls in love with her, and asks her out. Shimmer tells Samara to reject him; she accepts. Donsai then meets her at a yacht, where the two begin a conversation, and slowly Donsai decides to marry her. At the same time, Shimmer's plan is ruined, due to her boyfriend Pawan Raj Gandhi (Shahrukh Khan) arriving unexpectedly for Karwa Chauth. Pawan realizes Samarpreet's problem, and offers to help out in the plan as well. Shimmer realises her feelings for PRG and she goes to meet him at the airport. At last Donsai accepts Samarpreet as his wife.

Cast 
 Shah Rukh Khan as Pawan Raj Gandhi (Special appearance)
 Sushmita Sen as Shimmer Canhai
Fardeen Khan as Tej “Donsai” Dhanraj
Ishita Sharma as Samarpreet Kapoor Dhanraj/Samara Capore
Vivek Vaswani as Vakil
Parikshat Sahni as Mr. Vishal Kapoor
Beena Kak as Gurnaam Kapoor
Johnny Lever as Hussain Bhai
 Mohit Chadda as Jigar Shah
 Tara Sharma as Tanvi
 Suchitra Pillai as Jasmine
 Anushka Manchanda as Shyla 
 Nataliya Kozhenova as Jenny
 Randhir Kapoor as Suraj Rattan Dhanraj (special appearance)

Production

Casting
Sushmita plays the role of a successful supermodel called Shimmer. Shahrukh Khan was set to make a 60-minute appearance in the film. He filmed about 17 scenes and three songs. Among the three, one is his entry sequence. Khan enters the film in the second half but has a very powerful role. He was a part of the publicity but only in the parameters of his role. Dulha Mil Gaya was not marketed as a Shahrukh Khan film.

Filming
About half of the movie was shot in Amritsar and Mumbai. The other half was filmed in Trinidad and Tobago over a month and a half period in 2007, making it the first Bollywood film to be shot in the islands. Production was delayed a year and a half while Shahrukh Khan found time to shoot his scenes. Production was further delayed when Khan injured his shoulder during an action scene. Dulha Mil Gaya was given a U certificate after nine cuts by the censor board.

Critical response
The film received scathing reviews, with most critics blaming the script and lack of comedy. The film had a poor opening at the box office.

Box office
Dulha Mil Gaya made only Rs. 3 crores in India. Box Office India declared it a "Disaster."

In Trinidad and Tobago, probably because it was filmed there, the film was a success and ran for several weeks in packed cinema houses.

Overall, Dulha Mil Gaya collected Rs. 12 crores worldwide. In India, the film was declared a flop; in the overseas markets, it was declared a semi-hit.

Soundtrack

The soundtrack was composed by Lalit Pandit and released on 19 October 2009. The lyrics are written by Mudassar Aziz; songs are arranged by Richard Mithra and Kashinath Kashyap, and all songs are mixed and engineered by Abani Tanti. The song "Shirin Farhad" had music composed by Pritam and lyrics by Kumaar. According to Pandit, he had to listen to hip hop music to compose the album as he had never heard songs of the genre and had no experience writing hip-hop tracks.

Track listing

References

External links
 

2010 films
2010s Hindi-language films
Films shot in India
Films featuring songs by Pritam
Films set in Trinidad and Tobago
Indian romantic comedy films